Kadri Lepp (born on 13 December 1979) is an Estonian actress and children's writer.

She has graduated from Drama School of the Estonian Academy of Music and Theatre in 2002. Since 2000, she is working as an actress at Ugala Theatre.

Works
She has published three children's books:
Poiss, kes tahtis põgeneda (2016, Tänapäev)
Lugu hiirest, kellel polnud kelku (2016, Päike ja Pilv)
Tüdruk, kellel oli saladus (2017, Tänapäev)

References

External links

1979 births
Living people
Estonian stage actresses
Estonian television actresses
Estonian film actresses
21st-century Estonian actresses
Estonian children's writers
Estonian women children's writers
21st-century Estonian women writers
Estonian Academy of Music and Theatre alumni